Saccharopine is an intermediate in the metabolism of amino acid lysine. It is a precursor of lysine in the alpha-aminoadipate pathway which occurs in fungi and euglenids. In mammals and higher plants saccharopine is an intermediate in the degradation of lysine, formed by condensation of lysine and alpha-ketoglutarate.

Reaction
The reactions involved, catalysed by saccharopine dehydrogenases, are:

lysine + alpha-ketoglutarate ⇌ saccharopine ⇌ glutamate + 2-aminoadipate 6-semialdehyde

Pathology
Saccharopinuria (high amounts of saccharopine in the urine) and saccharopinemia (an excess of saccharopine in the blood) are conditions present in some inherited disorders of lysine degradation.

History
Saccharopine was first isolated in 1961 from yeasts (Saccharomyces, hence the name) by Darling and Larsen.

See also
 Opines

References

Tricarboxylic acids